Timing Is Everything may refer to:
 Timing Is Everything (album), a 2002 album by Chris de Burgh
 Timing Is Everything (TMNT 2003)
 Timing Is Everything, a 2018 extended play by Steven Lee Olsen